Kisan is a 2006 Indian Malayalam-language film directed by Sibi Malayil. The film stars Biju Menon, Kalabhavan Mani, Bhavana, and Geethu Mohandas. This film was first titled Ilakal Pacha Pookal Manja and was planned to release in early 2004, but because of some technical difficulties, the film was shelved and restarted shooting in 2006.

Cast
Biju Menon as Devan 
 Kalabhavan Mani as Velu
 Bhavana as Kilimathi Velu Sister 
 Geethu Mohandas as Ammu/Ambili Varma
 Shalu Menon as Kalyani
 I.M Vijayan as Football Coach (himself)
 Zeenath as Savithri
 Hakim Rawther as Velichapaadu
Thilakan as Muthassan
Kalashala Babu as Education Minister
Ponnamma Babu as Minister's PA
Risabawa as Balaraman Varma
Nishanth Sagar as Ambadi
Kalabhavan Shajon as Kuyilan
Geetha Salam as Ayyappan
Dinesh Prabhakar as Velayudhan
 Kaviraj as Vinu
 Ambika Rao as Ammalu
 Bindu KS as Ammu's mother
 KPAC Sabu as MLA കുട്ടപ്പായി

References

External links
 

2000s Malayalam-language films
2006 films
Films about farmers
Films scored by Johnson
Films scored by Kaithapram Viswanathan Namboothiri